The 1886 Atlantic hurricane season ran through the early summer and the first half of fall in 1886. This is the period of each year when most tropical cyclones form in the Atlantic basin. It was a very active year, with ten hurricanes, six of which struck the United States, an event that would not occur again until 1985 and 2020. Four hurricanes became major hurricanes (Category 3+). However, in the absence of modern satellite and other remote-sensing technologies, only storms that affected populated land areas or encountered ships at sea are known, so the actual total could be higher. An undercount bias of zero to six tropical cyclones per year between 1851 and 1885 and zero to four per year between 1886 and 1910 has been estimated. Of the known 1886 cyclones, Hurricane Seven and Tropical Storm Eleven were first documented in 1996 by Jose Fernandez-Partagas and Henry Diaz. They also proposed large alterations to the known tracks of several other 1886 storms.

Seasonal summary 

The 1886 Atlantic hurricane season commenced at 06:00 UTC on June 13. The season was approximately average, featuring 12 tropical storms compared to the 1981–2010 annual average of 12.1. The number of hurricanes, however, was well above average, with 10 forming compared to the annual average of 6.4. The number of major hurricanes—defined as Category 3 or higher on the modern Saffir–Simpson scale—was four, compared to an average of 2.7. Owing to deficiencies in surface weather observations at the time, the total number of tropical storms in 1886 was likely higher than 12. A 2008 study indicated that about three storms may have been missed by observational records due to scarce marine traffic over the open Atlantic Ocean. All but two of the storms in 1886 affected land at some point in the tropical stages of their life cycles. Of these, four hurricanes struck the island of Cuba, a record unsurpassed in any Atlantic hurricane season since then. According to the Cuban Meteorological Society, 1886 coincided with a highly active period, 1837–1910, in which one hurricane struck the island every 9.25 years. Additionally, seven hurricanes made landfall in the United States, establishing a record for the number of hurricane strikes in a single season. The years 1886–1887 featured 11 U.S. hurricane landfalls, setting a record for consecutive seasons until 2004–2005, when 12 such storms hit the country. Hurricane activity centered on the Gulf of Mexico: all seven landfalls in 1886 occurred on the U.S. Gulf Coast, with no hurricanes making landfall along the Atlantic Seaboard.

Although other storms may have gone undetected, tropical activity definitely began by the middle of June with the formation of the first named storm over the western Gulf of Mexico on June 13. Two other storms formed before the end of the month and also reached the Gulf of Mexico. A mid-July storm that formed over the western Caribbean moved northward and struck the west coast of Florida as a hurricane, after two earlier, stronger storms had already done so. Never before or since have so many hurricanes struck Florida in the same season before the month of August. Three storms, all of which attained major hurricane intensity, formed in close succession, over a span of eight days, in August. The first of these, the Indianola hurricane, was the strongest and most intense tropical cyclone of the season, striking multiple islands in the Greater Antilles before rapidly strengthening over the western Gulf of Mexico. September was a less active month than August, featuring two hurricanes on and just after mid-month. Two additional tropical storms occurred in October, with no further activity confirmed afterward.

Systems

Hurricane One 

Early in June, unsettled weather prevailed over the western Caribbean Sea, causing heavy rain and strong winds over Jamaica as early as June 7–8. However, ship reports and data from weather stations first confirmed that a low-pressure area formed off the coast of South Texas. Moving generally northward at first, the cyclone quickly intensified through the day as it gradually turned to the north-northeast, paralleling the Texas coast. By 06:00 UTC on June 14, the cyclone already attained hurricane status, and its parabolic path increasingly bent to the northeast. The cyclone rapidly weakened as it headed inland to the east-northeast, crossing south-central Louisiana as a tropical storm on June 15.

As it passed just offshore, the hurricane produced strong winds from the east and northeast in Galveston, Texas, generating very high tides. Observers suggested that only the shifting of the winds prevented severe flooding, possibly the worst since a hurricane in 1875; even so, small boats sustained significant damage. Waterfront structures, a tramway, and a railroad were destroyed. Upon making landfall, the hurricane brought a  storm tide and major flooding to Sabine Pass and its environs. Numerous structures and wharves were destroyed by wind or water, and winds tore roofs from houses. Fruit trees in the area lost much of their fruit. Saltwater intrusion extended several miles inland, imperiling livestock for want of freshwater. Across the state border in adjourning Louisiana, widespread flooding occurred at Calcasieu Pass, where a barge stranded and schooners were wrecked. Half of the corn crop in southwest Louisiana was damaged.

Hurricane Two 

Over the next two days, the storm meandered toward and through the Yucatán Channel, gradually intensifying as it proceeded to the north-northwest and north. Late on June 18, the system attained hurricane status off the western tip of Pinar del Río Province, Cuba. The following day, the cyclone turned to the north-northeast, producing "severe gales" over the waters off Cuba and Jamaica, as reported by ships. At 11:00 UTC on June 21, the cyclone made landfall a short distance east of St. Marks, Florida, as a Category 2 hurricane. The storm gradually decreased in intensity over the next day and a half as it crossed the Southeastern and Mid-Atlantic states.

Over a six-day period, a long duration of heavy rainfall from the storm caused severe flooding over parts of western Cuba, killing an undetermined number of people in flash floods. Winds over the island were apparently modest, however, though the rain over Vuelta Abajo was the heaviest over a one-week span in 29 years. Several locations were underwater following the deluge. As it passed west of Key West, Florida, the cyclone produced strong southerly winds there. At Cedar Key, gusts of  toppled trees, signage and communications wires, but caused little structural damage. Between there and Apalachicola, above-normal tides covered low-lying streets and pushed ships onshore. Heaviest damages were concentrated in and near Apalachicola and Tallahassee. The storm produced minimal effects in the Jacksonville area, as hurricane-force winds were confined to the west of the Gainesville–Lake City area. The strongest sustained winds measured in Florida were below hurricane force—only  at Cedar Key—but "high tides" affected much of the coastline near the point of landfall. A daily record for the month, also occurred in Washington, D.C.

In a 1949 report by meteorologist Grady Norton, the U.S. Weather Bureau—later the National Weather Service—considered the storm a "Great Hurricane", implying winds of at least , though reassessments could find no evidence that the cyclone ever reached major hurricane status.

Hurricane Three 

The system quickly strengthened as it headed north-northwest, acquiring hurricane intensity early the next day. Maintaining force, it struck Pinar del Río Province, Cuba, later that day. On June 29, the cyclone weakened as it crossed western Cuba, but began restrengthening over the eastern Gulf of Mexico as its path turned northwestward. Veering and accelerating to the northeast, the storm struck the Florida Panhandle near Indian Pass around 21:00 UTC that day. The cyclone weakened as it headed inland, losing its identity near Cedartown, Maryland, late on July 2.

In Jamaica, "at least" 18 deaths were attributed to the effects of the storm, and a ship west of the island experienced hurricane-force winds. While described as being of only "moderate intensity", the hurricane caused considerable damage to western Cuba, where homes were destroyed or lost their roofs and trees were prostrated; flooding was reportedly severe as well. Damage was concentrated in and near Batabanó and across Pinar del Río Province. Two drownings occurred when a ship capsized, and an unknown number of fatalities occurred on land in Cuba. Homes in town lost their roofs, frame buildings collapsed, and several craft in the bay sank, killing some people. At Cedar Key, high tides undermined roadways, and winds of  removed a warehouse from its foundation. Winds gusting to  uprooted large trees and moved railroad cars in Tallahassee; one person perished in Jefferson County. "Considerable" destruction of crops occurred in parts of North Florida and adjacent Georgia. Farther north, in North Carolina, winds of  affected Kitty Hawk and Fort Macon, respectively. Copious rains affected southeast Virginia over a two-day span, destroying railroad trestles and embankments.

Hurricane Four 

For two more days, the system drifted west-northwest, gradually strengthening. On July 16, the cyclone began turning to the northeast and accelerated. It reached hurricane status at 12:00 UTC on July 17 and passed just west of Cuba later that day. Around 01:00 UTC on July 19, the hurricane made landfall near Ozello, Florida, at that intensity. The storm soon lost hurricane status as it swiftly turned to the east-northeast, briskly crossing North Florida en route to the Atlantic Ocean. The storm acquired extratropical characteristics early on July 23, and after curving to the northeast over the far north Atlantic, it dissipated at 18:00 UTC on July 24.

Although it bypassed the island to the west, the cyclone generated heavy rains over western Cuba throughout July 16–17, causing rivers to overflow their banks. An anemometer in Key West measured top winds of  during the passage of the hurricane, with no damage to shipping in the harbor. A few schooners were forced to shelter in safe harbor overnight. Overall damage near the point of landfall in Florida was slight, as the area was thinly inhabited. Off the Atlantic coast of the Southeastern United States, the storm interrupted maritime traffic.

Hurricane Five 

The Indianola Hurricane of 1886

A tropical storm developed east of Trinidad and Tobago on August 12 and began moving northwestward. Originally it was thought the storm became a Category 1  hurricane the next day but re-analysis now shows it remained as a tropical storm until August 14. On the evening of August 15 it reached the island of Hispaniola. After crossing the south of that island as a Category 1 hurricane, it struck southeastern Cuba on August 16 as a Category 2 hurricane. The storm briefly weakened whilst over land and entered the Gulf of Mexico near Matanzas on August 18 as a Category 1 storm. As the hurricane crossed the Gulf of Mexico it strengthened further, first to a Category 2 then to a Category 3 cyclone. As it approached the coast of Texas, it had intensified to a  Category 4 hurricane.

On August 20, it made landfall as a category 4 hurricane at that strength with catastrophic results. At Indianola, Texas a storm surge of 15 feet overwhelmed the town. Every building in the town was either destroyed or left uninhabitable. When the Signal Office there was blown down, a fire started which took hold and destroyed several neighboring blocks. The village of Quintana, at the mouth of the Brazos River was also destroyed. At Houston the bayou rose between 5–6 feet on August 19. Bridges were overrun by flood water and trees blown over at Galveston. Offshore several ships were wrecked there. Since the town of Indianola was destroyed, it was abandoned and never rebuilt. After making landfall, the storm eventually dissipated on August 21 in the northwest corner of Texas.

Hurricane Six 

The Cuba Hurricane of 1886

On August 15 a hurricane was seen 90 miles northeast of Barbados. On August 16 it passed over the island of Saint Vincent as Category 2 hurricane. The hurricane passed north of Grenada and continued westward towards the coast of Venezuela, bringing a heavy gale, and some damage, to Curaçao before curving north. Around midnight on August 19 it hit Jamaica, still at Category 2 intensity. The island experienced winds of  throughout August 19 and 20th. The hurricane approached the south coast of Cuba as a major Category 3 hurricane on August 21. It crossed Cuba over the central province of Ciego de Ávila before exiting the island near Moron on the north coast. The hurricane then passed over Nassau on the night of August 22. It quickly moved northeastward, and travelled parallel to the east coast of the United States, still at Category 2 intensity, before it weakened and dissipated south of Newfoundland on the August 27.
Damage was extensive at several of the locations impacted by the hurricane and some fatalities occurred on St. Vincent, Jamaica and possibly Cuba. Throughout the south of St Vincent, damage was extensive with many injuries and some fatalities reported. Thousands of trees were blown down and 300 homes destroyed on the island. At Jamaica crops and plantations were destroyed and some ships wrecked in Kingston harbour. In Cuba hundreds of homes were blown down, many trees were uprooted and some areas flooded. In the Bahamas, several sailing ships were blown ashore, both at Nassau and at Andros and at the Berry Islands.

Hurricane Seven 

A tropical storm formed west of Bermuda on August 20. It passed about 175 miles to the south of the island before turning northwestward. As the storm travelled north on August 21, it intensified to a  Category 3 hurricane. It reached the area of Georges Bank at that intensity on August 22 and damaged several vessels there. On August 23 it weakened to a Category 1 hurricane and became an extratropical storm on August 24 near the Grand Banks.

Hurricane Eight 

A tropical storm formed north of Puerto Rico on September 16. It travelled west, passing north of Hispaniola on September 17 and crossing Cuba in the Las Tunas region on September 18. The next day the storm passed just south of Isla de la Juventud and continued westward before curving north into the Gulf of Mexico. As the storm travelled north, parallel to the east coast of Mexico, it intensified to a  Category 2 hurricane. The hurricane maintained this intensity until it made landfall just south of the Mexico–United States border early on September 23. After crossing into Texas, the system quickly weakened and dissipated the next day to the southeast of Austin. Two hundred houses were blown down there. Only five weeks after the devastation brought by Hurricane Five, Indianola was again flooded by rainwater and storm surge from Matagorda Bay. The remaining residents were evacuated. Following this storm the post office at Indianola was shut down, marking the official abandonment of the town.

Hurricane Nine 

A tropical storm formed in the western Atlantic on September 22. The storm maintained this intensity for six days until September 30, when it weakened to first a Category 1 hurricane then to a tropical storm. The cyclone never made landfall but is known from several ship reports. Most notable are those from the bark Mary, which endured the storm from September 22 until the 28th, and that of the brigantine Pearl which, on the evening of September 25, recorded sightings of ball lighting and "St. Elmo's light at the yard-arms" during the storm.

Hurricane Ten 

The Texas–Louisiana Hurricane of 1886

A tropical storm was observed in the northwest Caribbean on October 8. It moved to the northwest, reaching major hurricane strength in the Gulf of Mexico on October 11. Late on October 12, the hurricane made landfall as a category 3 hurricane near the border between Louisiana and Texas. It caused between 126 and 150 deaths in the East Texas area. due to the heavy rainfall and storm surge, with $250,000 in damage occurring. Port Eads, Louisiana and parts of New Orleans were reported to be flooded. Sabine Pass, Texas was all but destroyed. On the afternoon of October 12 wind speeds there reached  and waves from the Gulf were 20 feet high. Most buildings in the town were destroyed and ten miles of railroad track damaged. Numerous vessels were washed miles inshore and wrecked.
At Johnson Bayou, Louisiana most buildings in the town were destroyed, and many residents drowned, by the impact of a seven-foot storm surge which extended twenty miles inland. At least 196 people died as a result of the storm.

Tropical Storm Eleven 

A tropical storm existed in the western Atlantic between October 10 and October 15. It reached a peak wind speed of  throughout October 13 and 14. It is thought that the existence of this storm may have been responsible for the westward deviation taken by Hurricane Ten in the Gulf of Mexico on October 10.

Tropical Storm Twelve 

Several ships reported a large, but weak, tropical storm in the Caribbean Sea, south of Haiti on October 22. It is thought the storm had actually formed the previous day. After crossing Haiti on October 22 the storm continued moving northeastward into the Atlantic. The storm maintained a peak wind speed of  throughout October 23 and 24. It weakened on October 25 and dissipated on October 26 in the mid-Atlantic.

See also 

 Atlantic hurricane season
 Tropical cyclone observation
 Atlantic hurricane reanalysis project

Notes

References

External links 

Unisys Data for 1886 Atlantic Hurricane Season: 1886 Hurricane/Tropical Data for Atlantic

 
Articles which contain graphical timelines
1886 natural disasters
1886 meteorology